John Croker (1680–1751)  was an Irish politician.

Croker was born in Ballynagarde, County Limerick and educated at Trinity College, Dublin. He was MP for Kilmallock in County Limerick from 1723 to 1727. He died on 6 November 1751.

References

Irish MPs 1715–1727
Alumni of Trinity College Dublin
18th-century Irish people
Members of the Parliament of Ireland (pre-1801) for County Limerick constituencies
1680 births
1751 deaths